Zgornja Velka is a dispersed settlement in the Slovene Hills southeast of Sladki Vrh in the Municipality of Šentilj in northeastern Slovenia.

The parish church, built on a hill in the southern part of the settlement, is dedicated to Our Lady of the Snows and belongs to the Roman Catholic Archdiocese of Maribor. It was originally built in the late 17th century and rebuilt as a pilgrimage church in 1791.

References

External links
Zgornja Velka on Geopedia

Populated places in the Municipality of Šentilj